Cytochrome P450, family 1, subfamily A, polypeptide 1 is a protein that in humans is encoded by the CYP1A1 gene. The protein is a member of the cytochrome P450 superfamily of enzymes.

Function

Metabolism of xenobiotics and drugs
CYP1A1 is involved in phase I xenobiotic and drug metabolism (one substrate of it is theophylline). It is inhibited by hesperetin (a flavonoid found in lime, sweet orange), fluoroquinolones and  macrolides and induced by aromatic hydrocarbons.

CYP1A1 is also known as AHH (aryl hydrocarbon hydroxylase). It is involved in the metabolic activation of aromatic hydrocarbons (polycyclic aromatic hydrocarbons, PAH), for example, benzo[a]pyrene (BaP), by transforming it to an epoxide. In this reaction, the oxidation of benzo[a]pyrene is catalysed by CYP1A1 to form BaP-7,8-epoxide, which can be further oxidized by epoxide hydrolase (EH) to form BaP-7,8-dihydrodiol. Finally, CYP1A1 catalyses this intermediate to form BaP-7,8-dihydrodiol-9,10-epoxide, which is a carcinogen.

However, an in vivo experiment with gene-deficient mice has found that the hydroxylation of benzo[a]pyrene by CYP1A1 can have an overall protective effect on the DNA, rather than contributing to potentially carcinogenic DNA modifications. This effect is likely due to the fact that CYP1A1 is highly active in the intestinal mucosa, and thus inhibits infiltration of ingested benzo[a]pyrene carcinogen into the systemic circulation.

CYP1A1 metabolism of various foreign agents to carcinogens has been implicated in the formation of various types of human cancer.

Metabolism of endogenous agents
CYP1A1 also metabolizes polyunsaturated fatty acids into signaling molecules that have physiological as well as pathological activities.  CYP1A1 has monoxygenase activity in that it metabolizes arachidonic acid to 19-hydroxyeicosatetraenoic acid (19-HETE) (see 20-Hydroxyeicosatetraenoic acid) but also has epoxygenase activity in that it metabolizes docosahexaenoic acid to epoxides, primarily 19R,20S-epoxyeicosapentaenoic acid and 19S,20R-epoxyeicosapentaenoic acid isomers (termed 19,20-EDP) and similarly metabolizes eicosapentaenoic acid to epoxides, primarily 17R,18S-eicosatetraenoic acid and 17S,18R-eicosatetraenoic acid isomers (termed 17,18-EEQ). Synthesis of 12(S)-HETE by CYP1A1 has also been demonstrated. 19-HETE is an inhibitor of 20-HETE, a broadly active signaling molecule, e.g. it constricts arterioles, elevates blood pressure, promotes inflammation responses, and stimulates the growth of various types of tumor cells; however the in vivo ability and significance of 19-HETE in inhibiting 20-HETE has not been demonstrated (see 20-Hydroxyeicosatetraenoic acid).

The EDP (see Epoxydocosapentaenoic acid) and EEQ (see epoxyeicosatetraenoic acid) metabolites have a broad range of activities. In various animal models and in vitro studies on animal and human tissues, they decrease hypertension and pain perception; suppress inflammation; inhibit angiogenesis, endothelial cell migration and endothelial cell proliferation; and inhibit the growth and metastasis of human breast and prostate cancer cell lines. It is suggested that the EDP and EEQ metabolites function in humans as they do in animal models and that, as products of the omega-3 fatty acids, docosahexaenoic acid and eicosapentaenoic acid, the EDP and EEQ metabolites contribute to many of the beneficial effects attributed to dietary omega-3 fatty acids.  EDP and EEQ metabolites are short-lived, being inactivated within seconds or minutes of formation by epoxide hydrolases, particularly soluble epoxide hydrolase, and therefore act locally. CYP1A1 is one of the main extra-hepatic cytochrome P450 enzymes; it is not regarded as being a major contributor to forming the cited epoxides but could act locally in certain tissues such as the intestine and in certain cancers to do so.

Regulation
The expression of the CYP1A1 gene, along with that of CYP1A2/1B1 genes, is regulated by a heterodimeric transcription factor that consist of the aryl hydrocarbon receptor, a ligand activated transcription factor, and the aryl hydrocarbon receptor nuclear translocator.
In the intestine, but not the liver, CYP1A1 expression moreover depends on TOLL-like receptor 2 (TLR2), which recognizes bacterial surface structures such as lipoteichoic acid. Additionally, the tumour suppressor p53 has been shown to impact CYP1A1 expression thereby modulating the metabolic activation of several environmental carcinogens such as PAHs.

Polymorphisms
Several polymorphisms have been identified in CYP1A1, some of which lead to more highly inducible AHH activity. CYP1A1 polymorphisms include:
 M1, T→C substitution at nucleotide 3801 in the 3'-non-coding region
 M2, A→G substitution at nucleotide 2455 leading to an amino acid change of isoleucine to valine at codon 462
 M3, T→C substitution at nucleotide 3205 in the 3'-non-coding region
 M4, C→A substitution at nucleotide 2453 leading to an amino acid change of threonine to asparagine at codon 461

The highly inducible forms of CYP1A1 are associated with an increased risk of lung cancer in smokers.  (Reference = Kellerman et al., New Eng J Med 1973:289;934-937) Light smokers with the susceptible genotype CYP1A1 have a sevenfold higher risk of developing lung cancer compared to light smokers with the normal genotype.

References

Further reading 

 
 
 

1